On the night on June 5, 2022, militants from Allied Democratic Forces (ADF) attacked the village of Bwanasura, in Otomabere, North Kivu, in the Democratic Republic of the Congo. The attack killed over twenty civilians, marking one of the deadliest attacks by the ADF in 2022.

Background 
The Allied Democratic Forces, or ADF, are a jihadist militant group from Uganda that moved to the forests of the DRC's North Kivu region in the late 1990s, launching a brutal insurgency. In 2019, the group allied with the Islamic State, in particular the Central African branch. Since then, attacks on civilians by the ADF have increased throughout the 2020s, with attacks in the weeks prior to the Otomabere attack killing at least 43 people.

Attack 
The attack began on the night of June 5, 2022, in the village of Bwanasura near Otomabere. The ADF arrived at around 8 pm local time, "operating quietly" according to the local head of the Red Cross. Local survivors stated that the ADF fired gunshots, causing everyone to flee the area. In the attack, ADF fighters burned down at least 30 houses. Thirteen civilian motorcycles were destroyed in the attack. At some point in the night, the ADF fighters fled.

Aftermath 
The initial death toll after the attacks was eighteen, following the return of residents counting the bodies the next morning. Many of the dead were stabbed or shot to death. Later that day, the head of the local group Convention for the Respect of Human Rights stated the provisional death toll was 20.

The Red Cross stated that 36 bodies were found in the forests near Bwanasura in the following days. An official in Irumu territory stated that the victims were from several villages around Otomabere, including three from Mayimoya, four from Eringeti, and an unknown number of others from Oicha, the capital of Beni Territory.

In response to the attack, the Congolese army claimed they were "in pursuit of the assailants."

References 

Kivu conflict
Attacks in the Democratic Republic of the Congo
2022 in the Democratic Republic of the Congo